Manish Prakash is the head of the Telenor B2B division, having served in that role since September 2016.

Career 
Prakash is responsible for overall global strategy, overall growth of enterprise revenues and ecosystem innovation utilising digital, cloud, and IoT technologies. He has also served as the Chairman of Telenor Cloud Services, a subsidiary of Telenor ASA. Prior to this, Prakash served as President & Director for Airtel Business in India and South Asia.

Prakash has also served a member of the Airtel Management Board, and its subsidiary, Nxtra Data Systems.

References 

Telenor
Living people
Chief executives in the technology industry
Indian financial analysts
Year of birth missing (living people)